The 1974 Grambling Tigers football team represented Grambling State University as a member of the Southwestern Athletic Conference (SWAC) during the 1974 NCAA Division II football season. In its 32nd season under head coach Eddie Robinson, Grambling compiled an 11–1 record (5–1 against conference opponents), tied for the SWAC championship, defeated  in the Pelican Bowl, and outscored opponents by a total of 308 to 120. The team was recognized as the 1974 black college football national co-champion and was ranked No. 7 by the Associated Press in the final 1974 NCAA College Division football rankings.

Key players included freshman quarterback Doug Williams and split end Dwight Scales.  Williams later played nine seasons in the National Football League.

Schedule

Roster

Game summaries

Jackson State

1975 NFL Draft

References

Grambling State
Grambling State Tigers football seasons
Black college football national champions
Southwestern Athletic Conference football champion seasons
Grambling State Tigers football